Garut Oranges are a fruit variety grown in Indonesia's mountains and hilly areas in Garut Regency at Wanaraja, Samarang and Bayongbong Districts. These locations feature mountains or hilly areas, with highland views of more than 900 m (2,953 ft.) above sea level. Many kinds of fruits and vegetables compete for this growing area.

When Indonesia was a Dutch colony, Garut Oranges were considered one of Indonesia's most famous exotic fruits.

Garut Oranges have a good taste, good coloring, thick skin textures, and good aroma. Crops have been significantly damaged by Citrus Vein Phloem Degeneration (CVPD).

Oranges (fruit)
Fruits originating in Asia
Flora of Indonesia